FC Zorya Luhansk is a Ukrainian football team. Zorya Luhansk is based in the city of Luhansk, Ukraine. However, because of the Russo-Ukrainian War, the team plays its games at Slavutych-Arena in Zaporizhzhia.

The modern club as a team of masters was established on 10 April 1964 by the Football Federation of the Soviet Union merging the October Revolution Plant (Luhanskteplovoz) sports club Zorya and the Luhansk regional branch of the "Trudovye Rezervy" sports society. In 1972, as Zaria Voroshilovgrad, the club became the first provincial Soviet club to win the Soviet Top League title. Today, the modern club considers its predecessor the football team of the Luhansk Steam Locomotive Plant (October Revolution Steam Locomotive Plant, today Luhanskteplovoz) that was established back in 1923, however due to poor performance of the factory team in 1950s which played at republican level, the playing record of "Trudovye Rezervy" which played at all-Union level is also considered part of the club's history.

The club is a flagman club in Luhansk Oblast and one of three Ukrainian football "teams of masters" that won the Soviet Top League. The name Zorya means "dawn" in Ukrainian.


History

The modern professional team of Zorya Luhansk, during its Soviet period known also as Zaria Voroshilovgrad/Lugansk and for a short period Zorya-MALS, was created in 1964 as the city's team of masters by merging the factory team with another team of masters "Trudovye Rezervy". Before 1964, the factory team played mostly in republican competitions of the Ukrainian SSR.

The history of football in the city of Luhansk begins in the early 20th century.

The first Luhansk team was created in the Russian Empire in 1908 when the workers of the Russischen Maschinenbaugesellschaft Hartmann (today "Luhansk Locomotive") created the "Society of Rational Recreations". The one of the disciplines was a game of kickball headed by the Czech specialist Henrich Drževikovski from Prague, who originally was an instructor of gymnastics of the factory's ministerial school. That team played its games and conducted its training on the empty lot near the factory where today the sport hall "Zorya" is located.

The first mention of games involving the Luhansk team dates back to 1911. In 1913 in Kostyantynivka the first regional football league of Donets basin was created.  During World War I and the subsequent Soviet and German hostilities, the league was suspended until 1920, by which time the situation in the region had stabilized.

In 1922 in the city of Luhansk was built a new stadium, possibly "on the personal order" of Vladimir Lenin and later named after him. In 1923 the workers of the Luhansk steam train factory of the October Revolution (hence – the club's logo with a locomotive) organized their football team "Metalist" which became the forerunner of today's Zorya. The following year there the championship of the newly created Luhansk okruha (district) was created. In the final game the collective city team of Luhansk was victorious against their rivals from the city of Snizhne, winning the title after extra time 1–0. In 1926, the All-Ukrainian Committee of the Mining Workers' council organized a team of Donbass miners, players from Kadiivka, for a tour in Germany (Weimar Republic). There the Donbass team won four of their eight games. The following year an international game took place in Luhansk, in which the city team was challenged by their rivals from Austria. The Donbas players lost the game.

In 1936 the football teams "Metalist" and "Dynamo" (KGB team) merged to form the united Luhansk city-team which the following year was named Dzerzhynets. The name "Dzerzhynets" derives from the steam locomotive that was produced at the steam train factory FD – "Felix Dzerzhinsky". That year "Dzerzhynets" reached 3rd place in the Ukrainian second league.

In 1937 "Dzerzhynets" won Ukrainian's second league and was promoted to the first. Moreover, it reached the 1/8 final of the Ukrainian Сup and the 1/16 final of the Soviet Cup. The team consisted of the following players: Klad'ko (coach), Grebenyuk, Svidyns'ky, Mazanov, Morozov, Krasyuk, Nosko, Movchan, Brovenko, Chernyavs'ky, Voloschenko, Lokotosh, Sytnikov, Evdokymov, Myroshnikov, Ischenko.

In 1938 "Dzerzhynets" became champions of Ukraine after having won 9 games and drawn two. It was thus admitted to the Soviet First League.

Post war revival

After World War II, the club was not revived right away. The city of Luhansk was represented by Dynamo Luhansk, while in 1949–1951 there was as well a team of tge Luhansk regional party administration "Trudovi Rezervy". In 1950 Dynamo Luhansk merged into Trudovi Rezervy. In 1951 the chief of Trudovi Rezervy's regional administration, Ivan Lomakin; went on trial and the team was liquidated.

In 1948 "Dzerzhynets" was re-established in the lower leagues of the Ukrainian championship. Due to the liquidation of Trudovi Rezervy, Dzerzhynets was allowed to compete among the "mater teams" (Soviet terminology for their professional level). Few players from Trudovi Rezervy joined the factory team. In 1954, Dzerzhynets was transferred under the administration of the Republican Volunteer Society of "Avanhard" which continued its participation in competitions until 1959.

Due to a bleak performance of "Avanhard" in 1957 in the city of Voroshilovhrad, it was revived as another club "Trudovi Rezervy" which this time comprised students from the Leningrad Technicum of Physical Culture and Sports (today College of Physical Culture and Sports of the Saint Petersburg State University).

After the liquidation of Avanhard in 1959, in 1960 in Luhansk the October Revolution (OR) Factory team. was established.

Modern period
During the already ongoing 1964 season and playing several rounds, on 10 April 1964 the Soviet Football Federation issued its decision about merger of two clubs "Trudovi Rezervy" and OR Factory team (SC Zorya) into FC Zorya Voroshilovhrad.

In 1972 Zorya did not only win its only Soviet championship, but also represented, re-enforced with only three players from other clubs, the USSR at the Brazilian Independence Cup (Taça Independência) mid-year. However, only Volodymyr Onyshchenko represented the club at the Final of the European Football Championship few weeks earlier.

In 1992 the club was acquired by a Moscow Science-Production Association "MALS" and participated in the competition of the Ukrainian Top League.

In the season 2005–06 the team won first place in the Persha Liha, and had been promoted to the Vyscha Liha. Zorya was one of the original twenty teams to debut for the first season of the Ukrainian Premier League. The team played for five seasons until the 1995–96 season in which they finished eighteenth and were sent down to the Persha Liha. Zorya relegated to Druha Liha in 1996–97 season but she returned to Persha Liha in 2003–04 season.

In 2016 the team had advanced sufficiently in the standings that they were involved in the European wide play-offs in the UEFA Europa League. In the 2016-17 Europa League season, Zorya Luhansk played group matches against Feyenoord, Fenerbahçe, and Manchester United.

Names
Predecessors
 1923–35: FC Metallist Lugansk (city was renamed to Voroshilovgrad in 1935)
 1936–40: FC Dzerzhinets Voroshilovgrad (dissolved due to the war; named after Felix Dzerzhinsky)
 1948–53: FC Dzerzhinets Voroshilovgrad (team transferred under Avanhard sports society)
 1953–59: FC Avangard Voroshilovgrad (reorganized, city was renamed to Lugansk in 1958)
Trudovi Rezervy
 1949–51: Trudovye Rezervy Voroshilovgrad (team liquidated, criminal proceedings)
 1957–64: Trudovye Rezervy Lugansk (new team; team merged into SC Zorya)
Zorya
 1960–64: SC Zaria Lugansk (revived as the OR Factory sports club and reorganized)
 1964–70: FC Zaria Lugansk (merged with Trudovi Rezervy to united football club)
 1970–90: FC Zaria Voroshilovgrad (city was renamed to Voroshilovgrad in 1970)
 1990–91: FC Zaria Lugansk (city was renamed back to Lugansk in 1990)
 1992–96: FC Zorya-MALS Luhansk (renamed with adding of the sponsor name)
 1996–present: FC Zorya Luhansk (Ukrainian period, modern team)

Colours and badge

The clubs colours are black and white. In 2010 the club adopted own mascot, a black-white cat which after the club's relocation also moved to Zaporizhia.

The club's current badge was adopted after 2010 and was completely redesigned. In early 1990s the club's badge also carried the brand of local company "MALS". Earlier badges had a silhouette of an oncoming locomotive.

Stadium(s)
The oldest stadium in Luhansk is Lenin Stadium, built in 1922, and for long time was the main city stadium.

In March 1951, the Voroshilov Stadium was opened in Luhansk, with a capacity of 7,447 seats. The stadium belonged to the Lokomotiv production association Luhanskteplovoz. In 1961 it was renamed "Avanhard". Since 1962 it became the home for Trudovi Rezervy and later Zorya. In 2000-2002, the stadium was sold and became the property of the city. In 2003, Avanhard was fully renovated.

Following the Russian aggression against Ukraine, in 2014 Zorya relocated to Zaporizhia where it plays at Slavutych Arena.

Reserve team
The reserve team of Zorya, Zorya Luhansk Reserves (Ukrainian: ФК «Зоря» Луганськ дубль) are playing in the Ukrainian Premier Reserve League.

Sponsors
MediaMix Concept, D & M, Lir, and also Steel Symphony.

Football kits and sponsors

Honours
Since 1960 the football championship of the Ukrainian SSR among "teams of masters" was conducted as part of the Class B competitions which at first were second tier and later third tier until completely phased away. Afterwards, Ukrainian football competitions were adopted into one of zones of the Soviet Second League.

Another all-Ukrainian football competitions among "collectives of physical culture" (KFK) were conducted since 1964 that were ongoing until 1991 and sometimes are confused for the actually championship mentioned before. Neither Trudovi rezervy or Zorya played in competitions among collectives of physical culture", but did play in football championship of Ukrainian SSR which until 1959 was not considered as a competition among teams of masters.

Domestic competitions

Soviet Union
 Soviet Top League
 Winners (1): 1972
 Soviet Cup
 Runners-up (2): 1974, 1975
 Soviet First League (Class A, Second Group)
 Winners (2): 1962, 1966
 Soviet Second League
 Winners (1): 1986
 Runners-up (1): 1991 (West)
 Ukrainian SSR (parallel competition since 1960, please, refrain from placing it as the Soviet Second League as it not always had the same status)
 Winners (3): 1938, 1962, 1986
 Runners-up (1): 1950,

Ukraine
 Ukrainian Cup
 Runners-up (2): 2015–16, 2020–21
 Ukrainian First League
 Winners (1): 2005–06
 Ukrainian Second League
 Winners (1): 2002–03
 Runners-up (1): 1998-99 (Group C)

Current squad

Other players under contract

Out on loan

Coaches and administration

Presidents and owners
Source:
 1989–90: Administration Chairman Oleksiy Vintun
 1990: Club Chairman I. Shyrokyi
 1990: Club Chairman O. Lyakhov
 1990–92: President Yuriy Koniayev
 1992–96: President Volodymyr Tarasenko
 1996–01: President Dmytro Makarenko
 2001–02: President Volodymyr Makarov
 2002–05: President Yuriy Sevastianov
 2005–07: President Valeriy Shpichka
 2007–09: President and owner Valeriy Bukayev
 2009: Owner Marina Bukayeva
 2009: President Oleksandr Yehorov
 2009: President Manolis Pilavov
 2009–present: President and owner Yevhen Heller

Most capped players

Top scoring players

Managers

First team

Reserve team
  Volodymyr Mykytyn (2008 – 2021)

Longest serving coaches
Last Updated after 2020/21 season

League and Cup history

FC Zorya Luhansk spent 14 seasons in the Soviet top tier including the Class A Group One and the Top League (1967–1979). The club managed to become champions of the Soviet Union in 1972. Following dissolution of the Soviet Union, as Ukrainian club Zorya spent 20 seasons in the Ukrainian top tier including the Top League and the Premier League (1992–1996 and 2006–present).

The statistics is based on information from the club's official website.

Metalist, Dzerzhinets, Avanhard, Zorya

Soviet Union

Ukraine

Trudovi Rezervy

European record 

Notes
 1R: First round
 2R: Second round
 2Q: Second qualifying round
 3Q: Third qualifying round
 PO: Play-off round

Notes

References

External links

 Official website
 Fan website
  zarya.lg.ua – Information site of fans of FC Zarya Lugansk
  Unofficial website
  "Zorya" (Dawn) of the football Luhansk-land  - Information about football in Luhansk Oblast on Football Federation of Ukraine website
  Luhansk Our Football. Statistics, historical trivia, regional competitions overview

 
Association football clubs established in 1923
1923 establishments in Ukraine
Soviet Top League clubs
Ukrainian Premier League clubs
Football clubs in Luhansk
Football clubs in the Ukrainian Soviet Socialist Republic
Avanhard (sports society)
Manufacturing association football clubs in Ukraine
Sports team relocations